Since debuting in 1997, The View has garnered numerous awards and honors, among them are 30 Daytime Emmy Awards, which include Outstanding Talk Show and Outstanding Talk Show Host for Whoopi Goldberg, Joy Behar, Sherri Shepherd, Elisabeth Hasselbeck, and Barbara Walters, and 4 NAACP Image Awards. In addition, the show has received nominations for 4 People's Choice Awards, 3 GLAAD Media Awards, and a Critics' Choice Television Award.

List of wins and nominations

References

View